Colobothea denotata is a species of beetle in the family Cerambycidae. It was described by Monné in 2005. It is known from Brazil.

References

denotata
Beetles described in 2005